Brute, in comics, may refer to:

Marvel Comics:
Brute (Morlocks), one of the lesser known Morlocks in the main Marvel universe
Brute (Reed Richards), the name of an alternative Earth version of Mister Fantastic who became a member of the Frightful Four on True Earth
DC Comics:
Brute, a soldier character in the series Hunter's Hellcats
Brute (Sandman), a character in the series The Sandman
Brute, an antagonist who has appeared in Superman comics arresting him for the Tribunal Planet. He is the brother of Mope
Brute, a villain and a member of the Extremists
Brute (Atlas/Seaboard), a Hulk-like character from former Marvel Comics publisher Martin Goodman's Atlas/Seaboard Comics
Brute, an Image Comics character from Savage Dragon and a member of the Vicious Circle

See also
Brute (disambiguation)

References